is a Japanese politician of the Liberal Democratic Party and a member of the House of Representatives in the Diet (national legislature). He served as the Minister of Internal Affairs and Communications from 2 October 2018 to 11 September 2019. A native of Kainan, Wakayama and graduate of Waseda University, he was elected to the first of his three terms in the Wakayama Prefectural Assembly in 1983 and then to the first of his two terms as mayor of Kainan in 1994. He was elected to the House of Representatives for the first time in 2002.

References

External links 
  in Japanese.

1952 births
Living people
People from Wakayama Prefecture
People from Kainan, Wakayama
Waseda University alumni
Mayors of places in Japan
Members of the House of Representatives (Japan)
Liberal Democratic Party (Japan) politicians
21st-century Japanese politicians
Members of the Wakayama Prefectural Assembly
Ministers of Internal Affairs of Japan